first opened under another name in Kashihara, Nara Prefecture, Japan, in 1940. The collection includes artefacts excavated from Fujinoki Kofun that have been designated a National Treasure. In addition to the permanent display, there are two special exhibitions each year, in spring and autumn.

History
The Archaeological Institute of Kashihara was established in 1938 in connection with Kashihara Jingū's preparations for the 2,600th anniversary celebrations of the legendary foundation of Japan in 660 BC by Emperor Jimmu. Its formal registration as a museum proper was in 1968, a year after the move to a new building. In April 1980 the Museum gained its current name. A new hall opened in October that year; this was renewed in 1997.

See also
 List of National Treasures of Japan (archaeological materials)
 Nara National Research Institute for Cultural Properties
 List of Historic Sites of Japan (Nara)
 List of Cultural Properties of Japan - historical materials (Nara)
 List of Cultural Properties of Japan - archaeological materials (Nara)
 Nara National Museum
 Kashihara Shrine

References

External links
  The Museum, Archaeological Institute of Kashihara, Nara Prefecture
  The Museum, Archaeological Institute of Kashihara, Nara Prefecture

Museums in Nara Prefecture
Archaeological museums in Japan
Kashihara, Nara
Museums established in 1940
1940 establishments in Japan